Edward Flewett Darling (born 24 July 1933) was Bishop of Limerick and Killaloe from 1985 to 2000.

Biography
Darling was born into an ecclesiastical family and educated at St. John's School, Leatherhead and Trinity College, Dublin. He was ordained in 1956: his first posts being curacies in Belfast. He then held incumbencies at  St Gall’s  Carnalea,  County Down and  St John’s Malone, Belfast before his ordination to the episcopate.

William Flewett, his grandfather, was Bishop of Cork, Cloyne and Ross from 1933 to 1938.

References

1933 births
People educated at St John's School, Leatherhead
Alumni of Trinity College Dublin
20th-century Anglican bishops in Ireland
Bishops of Limerick and Killaloe
Living people